Petro Jazz is an international jazz festival in Saint Petersburg, Russia. It is known as the biggest open-air jazz event in north-west Russia. Established in 2003, it changed its name from Peter & Paul Jazz Festival to Jazz Q in 2005 and finally to Petro Jazz in 2008. The location of the festival is Peter & Paul Fortress, the very heart of St. Petersburg, situated on an island in the middle of Neva River. Petro Jazz introduced to the Russian public such jazz stars as Marcus Miller, Maceo Parker, Dave Weckl and many others.

References

External links 
 petrojazz.ru

Music in Saint Petersburg
Jazz festivals in Russia
Music festivals established in 2003
Festivals in Saint Petersburg